Ekaterina Gromova (born ) is a retired Russian female volleyball player. She was part of the Russia women's national volleyball team whose position was opposite hitter.

She participated in the 2007 Women's European Volleyball Championship.

References

External links
https://norceca.net/Old_News%20Files/Archives_11.htm

1986 births
Living people
Russian women's volleyball players
Place of birth missing (living people)